Gilvossius tyrrhenus (formerly Pestarella tyrrhena) is a species of thalassinidean crustacean (ghost shrimp or mud shrimp) which grows to a length of . It lives in burrows in shallow sandy parts of the sea-bed in the Mediterranean Sea and northern Atlantic Ocean. It is the most common thalassinidean in the Mediterranean, and has been used as bait by fishermen for at least 200 years.

Description
It is whitish or greenish-grey, with pink or blue spots. Because of its burrowing lifestyle, G. tyrrhenus has small eyes on short stalks, and its maxillipeds can form an operculum; the telson is very short, and the rostrum is almost entirely absent.

Larval development is rapid and involves few stages. Eggs hatch into a zoeal stage, which is followed by a second zoea and then a megalopa stage before adulthood. This rapid development allows the larvae to settle down into their adult habitat of relatively undisturbed muddy substrates, before they have travelled too far as planktonic larvae. Larval development is retarded by low salinities and aided by warmer temperatures, giving G. tyrrhenus a shorter reproductive season in the north of its range than in the south.

Distribution and ecology
G. tyrrhenus was first described from the Tyrrhenian Sea, and is found throughout the Mediterranean as well as in the Atlantic Ocean from Mauritania and the Canary Islands north to Ireland, in the Kattegat, and in the North Sea as far as southern Norway. Related species occur in the Black Sea, and G. tyrrhenus avoids water of low salinity, such as estuaries and the Baltic Sea.

These shafts may be linked by further sections, and a number of side–chambers are found filled with seagrass. The overall volume of the burrow may reach . New tunnels are continually opened and old ones filled in. G. tyrrhenus feeds directly on the sediment, and receives nutrition from the debris collected in the debris chambers, as well as from the foraminiferans and algae which live on the walls of the burrow. The activity of G. tyrrhenus leads the walls of the burrow to be enriched with three times the ambient number of nematodes and more than 100 times the number of foraminiferans in the surrounding sediments.

G. tyrrhenus is parasitised by the isopod Ione thoracica and the barnacle Parthenopea subterranea.

References

Thalassinidea
Crustaceans of the Atlantic Ocean
Crustaceans described in 1792